Michael W. Herren is a Canadian historian, particularly in antique and medieval Latin literature, currently Distinguished Research Professor Emeritus at York University, Toronto. 

In 1990, he founded The Journal of Medieval Latin at University of Toronto. He is a Fellow of the Royal Society of Canada and Royal Irish Academy and, after retiring in 2006, he was honored with a Festschrift. A year later, he was named a distinguished visiting professor at University of California, Berkeley.

References

Year of birth missing (living people)
Living people
Academic staff of York University
20th-century Canadian historians
Fellows of the Medieval Academy of America
Fellows of the Royal Society of Canada
21st-century Canadian historians
Guggenheim Fellows